= Werhahn Group =

- Native name: Wilh. Werhahn KG
- Type: Private
- Key people: Anton Werhahn (President); Alexander Boldyreff; Andreas Koenig; Stephan Kranz; Gerrit Schneider
- Revenue: ▲US$5.65 billion (2024)
- Owner: Werhahn family
- Number of employees: 10,508 (2024)
- Website: werhahn.de

Werhahn Group (officially Wilh. Werhahn KG) is a German multinational conglomerate headquartered in Neuss, Germany. The company is made up of three corporate divisions which are building materials, consumer goods and financial services. Werhahn is privately owned by the 420 members of the Werhahn family.
